is a railway station on the Iiyama Line in the city of Iiyama, Nagano Prefecture, Japan, operated by East Japan Railway Company (JR East). Since 14 March 2015, it is also a stop on the high-speed Hokuriku Shinkansen line from Tokyo to Kanazawa.

Lines
Iiyama Station is served by the Iiyama Line, and is 19.2 kilometers from the starting point of the line at Toyono Station. Iiyama is served by Hakutaka services operating between Tokyo and Kanazawa, although not all trains will stop at Iiyama.

Station layout
The elevated Shinkansen platforms cross the ground-level Iiyama Line platforms at an angle. The station has a "Midori no Madoguchi" staffed ticket office.

Platforms
The Iiyama Line is served by a ground-level island platform with tracks on either side.

The Shinkansen platforms consist of two 312 m long side platforms serving two tracks. The platforms are fitted with chest-high platform edge doors.

History

Iiyama Station opened on 20 October 1921. With the privatization of JNR on 1 April 1987, the station came under the control of JR East.

The new station structure opened on 9 November 2014.

Passenger statistics
In fiscal 2021, the station was used by an average of 719 passengers daily (boarding passengers only). Passenger figures for previous years are as shown below.

Surrounding area
 Iiyama City Hall

 Chikuma River

See also
List of railway stations in Japan

References

External links

 JR East station information 

Railway stations in Nagano Prefecture
Stations of East Japan Railway Company
Iiyama Line
Hokuriku Shinkansen
Railway stations in Japan opened in 1921
Iiyama, Nagano